Shi Shuqing (born 1945) is a Taiwan-Chinese writer and educator.

She was born in Lukang, Changhua and is the sister of writer Li Ang. Shi was educated at Tamkang University and City University of New York. She taught at Taipei's National Chengchi University. In 1978, Shi moved to Hong Kong where she became director of Asian programs at the Hong Kong Arts Centre, later working as a consultant there. She returned to Taiwan in 1997.

Selected works 
 The Barren Years and Other Short Stories and Plays, English translation (1975)
 Yi ye you : Xianggang de gu shi (One night journeys - Hong Kong stories, short stories (1985))
 Xianggang sanbuqu (Hong Kong trilogy) (1993, 1995, 1997)
 Weiduoliya julebu (The Victoria Club), novella (1993)
 Weixun caizhuang (Blush of intoxication), novel (1999)
 City of the Queen, novel translated by Howard Goldblatt (2008)

References 

1945 births
Living people
Taiwanese women novelists
Tamkang University alumni
City University of New York alumni
Academic staff of the National Chengchi University